Alessandro Musotti (died 23 January 1607) was a Roman Catholic prelate who served as Bishop of Imola (1579–1607).

Biography
On 9 December 1579, Alessandro Musotti was appointed during the papacy of Pope Gregory XIII as Bishop of Imola.
He served as Bishop of Imola until his death on 23 January 1607. 
While bishop, he was the principal co-consecrator of Silvio Savelli (cardinal), Archbishop of Rossano (1582).

References

External links and additional sources
 (for Chronology of Bishops) 
 (for Chronology of Bishops) 

16th-century Italian Roman Catholic bishops
17th-century Italian Roman Catholic bishops
Bishops appointed by Pope Gregory XIII
1607 deaths